The Sri Lanka women's national cricket team toured India in January 2014. They played India in three One Day Internationals and three Twenty20 Internationals, losing the ODI series 3–0 but winning the T20I series 2–1.

Squads

Tour Match: India A v Sri Lanka

WODI Series

1st ODI

2nd ODI

3rd ODI

WT20I Series

1st T20I

2nd T20I

3rd T20I

References

External links
Sri Lanka Women tour of India 2013/14 from Cricinfo

International cricket competitions in 2014
2014 in women's cricket
Women's international cricket tours of India
Sri Lanka women's national cricket team tours